James S. Lakin House is a historic home located at Terra Alta, Preston County, West Virginia. It was built in 1895, and is a -story, frame Colonial Revival style dwelling. It has a "T"-shaped plan and the roof structure has four intersecting gables. It features a full width front porch with a semi-circular end and a shallow hipped roof supported by Tuscan order columns.

It was listed on the National Register of Historic Places in 1997.

References

Houses on the National Register of Historic Places in West Virginia
Colonial Revival architecture in West Virginia
Houses completed in 1895
Houses in Preston County, West Virginia
National Register of Historic Places in Preston County, West Virginia